"What's on Your Mind" is a single by American R&B singer George Benson, which entered the UK Singles Chart on 7 February 1981. It reached a peak position of number 45, and remained on the chart for 5 weeks.

References 

George Benson songs
1980 singles
Warner Records singles
1980 songs
Songs written by Glen Ballard
Songs written by Kerry Chater